Khagaria is a city in Indian state of Bihar and the administrative headquarters of Khagaria district. Khagaria is a part of Munger division. The Khagaria Junction railway station serves the city.It is situated about 25 km north of Munger.

Demographics
According to the 2011 India census, Khagaria nagar parishad had a population of 49,406, of which 26,594 were males and 22,812 were females. Population of children in the age group of 0 to 6 years was 7,273. The literacy rate was 71.1%, of which male literacy was 74.7% and female literacy was 70.%. The Scheduled Castes and Scheduled Tribes population was 3,782 and 89 respectively. There were 9123 household in Khagaria in 2011.

 India census, Khagaria had a population of 45,126. Males constitute 55% of the population and females 45%. Khagaria has an average literacy rate of 64.2%, of which male literacy was 69.8% and female literacy is 57.5%. In Khagaria, 17% of the population is under 6 years of age.

References

 
Cities and towns in Anga Desh
Cities and towns in Khagaria district